Beatriz Alexim Nunes (born April 4, 1958 in Rio de Janeiro, Brazil) better known as Bia Nunnes, is a Brazilian actress. She is the sister of actress Maria Cristina Nunes and daughter of the writer and humorist Max Nunes. She has been married to Fernando Berditchevsky since 1982.

Career 

Owner of a very personal style of humor, Bia Nunnes became widely known for his comic turns in the program as the Viva o Gordo, Jô Soares in the success of Rede Globo in the early 1980s. In that same decade, debuted as the protagonist in the novel Amor com Amor Se Paga, Ivani Ribeiro in 1984.

Partner Miguel Falabella, she was featured on the first novel signed by him and Maria Carmen Barbosa in 1996, Salsa e Merengue.

The actress also developed career in the theater, emphasizing, among others, the play The Vagina Monologues. On stage he has worked with Marília Pêra, Marco Nanini, Miguel Falabella, Jorge Fernando, Wolf Maya and Aderbal Freire Jr, among other prestigious names in the panorama of the Brazilian theater.

Bia debuted in film in the film O Cavalinho Azul, Eduardo Escorel in 1984. The following year was cast by Júlio Bressane the beautiful Brás Cubas, a very personal vision of the filmmaker on the classic character of Machado de Assis. Bia fit like a glove in the proposed scenic and aesthetic Júlio Bressane and ended up working in three major films of the filmmaker: Sermões - A História de Antônio Vieira, Miramar and São Jerônimo.

In 2009, the actress shows up in Portugal with the number Humor a Vapor, which is also producing. This is a comedy that also shows the influence of the Portuguese theater and magazine in Brazil since the past decades. During the 75 minutes of play, Bia Nunnes shares the stage with Beto Coville, actor and director who works in Brazil and Portugal, where he has lived for 16 years, couples playing in unusual situations. Directed by director Fernando Berditchevsky, Bia Nunnes who is married since 1982. Humor a Vapor is based on texts and music of humorists Artur Azevedo, Max Nunes and Luis Fernando Verissimo, with the final text of the authorship of the actress and director of the show.

In 2011, Bia Nunnes is playing with the play Igual a Você, alongside Camila Morgado and Anderson Müller. That same year, is cast in the soap opera Aquele Beijo of Miguel Falabella.

Filmography

Television

Films 
 1984 - O Cavalinho Azul... Teacher
 1985 - Brás Cubas
 1989 - Sermões - A História de Antônio Vieira
 1997 - Miramar
 1999 - São Jerônimo... Paula

References

External links 

1958 births
Living people
Actresses from Rio de Janeiro (city)
Brazilian television actresses
Brazilian telenovela actresses
Brazilian film actresses
Brazilian stage actresses